Veternik is a suburban settlement of the city of Novi Sad, Serbia. Its population numbers 17,454 (2011 census) and most of its inhabitants are ethnic Serbs. Over the years, especially in the 1990s, it grew with size and inhabitants thus merging with Futog to the west and Novi Sad to the east.

Name

The settlement was named in honour of the assault of the Serbian army in the Veternik mountain area during the breach of the Macedonian front in World War I. It was first called Novi Veternik ("New Veternik"), but was later changed into Veternik. The name Veternik itself means "windy" in Serbian. 

In Serbian Cyrillic, the settlement is known as Ветерник (in Serbian Latin as Veternik) and in Hungarian as Hadikliget.

History

The first settlement at this location was mentioned in 1848  and its name was Neu Ilof. It was a settlement for workers that worked in the nearby estate whose last owner was count Kotek. 

The modern settlement was founded in 1918  as a settlement for Serb veterans from World War I. During World War II, the Hungarian occupational authorities relegated the population of the village across the Danube, and settled Hungarians from Bukovina into their houses. After the war, the population returned and settlement largely developed in the next period: from only 789 inhabitants that were recorded by the 1948 census, the population of Veternik rose to 18,626 in 2002.

Demographics

Status
Officially, Veternik  holds suburban settlement status, as it is part of the agglomeration of Novi Sad. Today, Veternik has merged with Novi Sad completely.

Features

Besides basic village infrastructure (post office, two elementary schools, infirmary, library, market etc.), Veternik is also home to an institution for handicapped children and young people.

In 2009 the city of Nova Sad decided to build a new primary school in Veternik with access for children with disabilities. The new school was named after the local philanthropist Marija Trandafil.

See also
 List of places in Serbia
 List of cities, towns and villages in Vojvodina

References

 Slobodan Ćurčić, Broj stanovnika Vojvodine, Novi Sad, 1996.

External links 

 Elementary school Marija Trandafil 
 The Home for Handicapped Children and Young People in Veternik 
 FC Veternik Viskol

Places in Bačka
Suburbs of Novi Sad
1918 establishments in Serbia
South Bačka District